Lenka Knapová (born 22 March 1970) is a Czech former pair skater who represented Czechoslovakia. With René Novotný, she won four Czechoslovak national titles and competed at seven ISU Championships; the pair's best result, fourth, came at the 1987 European Championships in Sarajevo, Yugoslavia. They also competed at the 1988 Winter Olympics in Calgary, Alberta, Canada, but withdrew after placing 9th in the short program. Ivan Rezek served as their coach.

Knapová had knee problems. She retired from competition in 1988.

Competitive highlights 
With Novotný

References 

1970 births
Czech female pair skaters
Czechoslovak female pair skaters
Figure skaters at the 1988 Winter Olympics
Living people
Olympic figure skaters of Czechoslovakia
Sportspeople from Zlín